The Sigmund's miner bee (Andrena sigmundi) is a species of miner bee in the family Andrenidae. Another common name for this species is the Sigmund's andrena. It is found in North America.

References

Further reading

 
 

sigmundi
Articles created by Qbugbot
Insects described in 1902